James Louis Theodore Guise (26 August 1910 – 18 June 1996) was an English first-class cricketer and solicitor.

Guise was born at Calcutta in British India to John Dougal Guise, an East India merchant. He was educated in England at Winchester College, before going up to Trinity College, Oxford. After graduating from Trinity, Guise became a lawyer. He made one appearance in first-class cricket in 1937 for the Free Foresters against Oxford University at Oxford. Batting twice in the match, Guise was dismissed for 11 runs by Randle Darwall-Smith in the Free Foresters first-innings, while following-on in their second-innings he was dismissed for 7 runs by the same bowler.

He continued to practice law until his retirement in 1969. He was a past president of the Holborn Law Society. Guise died in June 1996 at Lingfield, Surrey. His brother, John, Jr., was also a first-class cricketer.

References

External links

1910 births
1996 deaths
People from Kolkata
People educated at Winchester College
Alumni of Trinity College, Oxford
English solicitors
English cricketers
Free Foresters cricketers
20th-century English lawyers
British people in colonial India